Bayside High School is an American public high school located in the Bayside neighborhood of the New York City borough of Queens. It is administered by the New York City Department of Education.

Performance
Bayside is one of the highest performing schools in the New York City Department of Education. Its students are admitted into six newly updated programs: Digital Art & Design, Music Performance & Production, Environmental Engineering & Technology, Humanities & Non-Profit Management, Computer Programming & Web Design, and Sports Medicine & Management. These programs offer students the opportunity to earn college credits, participate in industry internships and learn more about careers in the field.

The school has a 98.6% four-year graduation rate, the highest of any large open-admissions high school in the NYC DOE. The school has pioneered Whole Child Guidance practices and is further improving curriculum through the additions of internships and of numerous college-accredited courses. Bayside High School has been recognized for "closing the achievement gap" for minority students, English language learners (ELL) and students with special needs. The school offers their students to graduate early if they earn the proper amount of credits. 

As of the 2021–22 school year, the school had an enrollment of 3,025 students and 185.5 classroom teachers (on an FTE basis), for a student–teacher ratio of 16.3:1. There were 2,049 students (67.7% of enrollment) eligible for free lunch and 159 (5.3% of students) eligible for reduced-cost lunch.

History
Bayside High School, Samuel J. Tilden High School, Abraham Lincoln High School, John Adams High School, Walton High School, Andrew Jackson High School, and Grover Cleveland High School were all built during the Great Depression from one set of blueprints, in order to save money. Bayside and Andrew Jackson HS were the final two schools to be completed. The design was based on Kirby Hall in Gretton, Northamptonshire, England. The schools were designed as small campuses to provide a "somewhat collegiate atmosphere". The design of Bayside High School and the other schools, created by architect Walter C. Martin, was considered to be "a modern adaptation of the Adams, Lincoln, and Tilden High Schools", which had all been completed by 1929. Bayside High School was also the first school building in the city to be constructed using Federal funds, built by the Public Works Administration from 1934 to 1936 at the cost of $2.5 million (equivalent to $ million in ).

Bayside opened its doors on March 16, 1936, taking in 2,300 students who had previously attended Flushing High School.

In 1978 the Bayside High School music program, then under department chairman Sidney Lovett and teacher John Benza, was among the first secondary schools in the nation to purchase and teach music synthesis on a synthesizer, the Roland System 100.

Notable alumni

 Eric Adams (born 1960), Mayor of New York City and former borough President of Brooklyn
 Adrienne Adams  (born 1960), Speaker of the New York City Council, New York City Councilwoman from the 28th district
 Peggy Adler (born 1942, class of 1959), author and illustrator of children's books; investigative researcher
 Ellen Baker (born 1953, class of 1970), astronaut
 Jordan Belfort (born 1962), former investment banker whose life was the basis the film The Wolf of Wall Street
 Action Bronson (born 1983, class of 2002), rapper
 Mic Geronimo (born 1973), rapper and former reality star
 Glenn Consor, sports broadcaster, Washington Wizards broadcasts, and former NCAA and pro basketball player
 Chy Davidson (born 1959), former professional football player
 Margaret Oakley Dayhoff (1925–1983), chemist, valedictorian, class of 1942
 Steve Englebright (born 1946, class of 1964), paleontologist, politician—member of the New York State Assembly
 Jason Eskenazi (born 1960), photographer
 Mae Faggs (1932–2000), track-and-field athlete who was a gold medalist in the Women's 4 × 100 meters relay at the 1952 Summer Olympics
 Mohammad Salman Hamdani (1977-2001), lauded for heroism on 9/11
 Bobby Hammond (born 1952, class of 1971), Educator:/doctoral candidate, Former National Football League player & coach
 Ronnie Harmon (born 1964), professional football player
 Scott Ian (born 1963, class of 1981), musician, best known as the rhythm guitarist for the heavy metal band Anthrax
 Jipsta (born 1974 as John Patrick "JP" Masterson, class of 1992; valedictorian), rapper who has appeared six times on the Billboard Dance chart
 Daymond John (born 1969), founder, president, and CEO of FUBU; investor on the ABC reality television series Shark Tank
 Matthew Kaye (born 1974), former World Wrestling Entertainment wrestler/announcer, currently working for Lucha Underground as an announcer.
 Brian Lehrer (born 1952), host of WNYC's The Brian Lehrer Show, a local call in radio show.
Dan Lilker (born 1964), heavy metal musician, bassist for Nuclear Assault, Brutal Truth and founding member of Anthrax
 Olivia Longott (born 1981), R&B Singer/rapper, Class of 1998, currently on the VH1 show Love & Hip Hop
 David Nolan (born 1946), historian and author of Fifty Feet in Paradise and The Houses of St. Augustine
 John Paulson (born 1955), founder and president of Paulson & Co., a New York-based hedge fund
 Andrea Peyser (born 1959), columnist for the New York Post
 Vincent Rey (born 1987), professional football player
 Steven J. Ross, Pulitzer Prize finalist and professor at the University of Southern California
 Scott Salem (class of 1970), radio personality, best known as the engineer for The Howard Stern Show
 Gia Scala (1934-1972), actress
 Jack Sinagra (1950–2013), politician who served in the New Jersey Senate from 1992 to 2001.
 Norman Sturner (born 1940), real estate developer
 Joe Thomas (born 1963, class of 1981), talk radio host, radio program director (WCHV/Monticello Media) in Charlottesville, Virginia
 Mike Tirico (born 1966), announcer for ESPN
 Tobias Truvillion (born 1975), actor
 Neil Turbin (born 1963), heavy metal musician, first full-time singer in Anthrax

References

External links
 Bayside High School website
 Bayside High School Football website

1936 establishments in New York City
Bayside, Queens
Educational institutions established in 1936
Public high schools in Queens, New York